Pierluigi Sartorelli (29 December 1912 – 28 April 1996) was an Italian prelate of the Catholic Church who worked in the diplomatic service of the Holy See.

Biography 
Pierluigi Sartorelli was born on 29 December 1912 in Venice, Italy. He was ordained a priest on 19 September 1942 for the Archdiocese of Rijeka.

To prepare for a diplomat's career he entered the Pontifical Ecclesiastical Academy in 1947.

He worked in the nunciature in Bern, Switzerland, from 1965 to 1967.

On 9 November 1967, Pope Paul VI appointed him titular archbishop of Semina and named him to Apostolic Pro-Nuncio to Kenya. Cardinal Giovanni Urbani ordained him a bishop on 8 of December. On 19 April 1968 Pope Paul named him also Apostolic Pro-Nuncio to Tanzania.  Sartorelli resigned from that second position on 22 December 1970.

On 7 October 1972, Pope Paul appointed him Titular Archbishop of Castello.

Sartorelli resigned as nuncio to Kenya on 16 January 1976. He died on 28 April 1996.

References

External links
Catholic Hierarchy: Archbishop Pierluigi Sartorelli  

Apostolic Nuncios to Kenya
Apostolic Nuncios to Tanzania
Clergy from Venice
1912 births
1996 deaths